Bhagavan Mahamayavi Antle  (born March 16, 1960), also known as Kevin Antle or Doc Antle, is an American animal trainer and private zoo operator.

Antle began raising dogs in his youth, and started operating a private zoo in 1983. Antle has worked as an animal trainer for films including Ace Ventura and Dr. Doolittle in addition to appearing as a guest on several television shows. In 2020, he was featured in the first season of Netflix true crime documentary series Tiger King. Antle was the subject of a follow up documentary Tiger King: The Doc Antle Story released in December 2021.

Antle has faced accusations of animal cruelty throughout his career. In October 2020, Antle was charged with two felony counts related to wildlife trafficking and 13 additional misdemeanors after an investigation by the Attorney General of Virginia. Antle has also has faced public allegations of inappropriate relationships with minors at the private Buckingham County, Virginia zoo, and of operating a cult at the Myrtle Beach Safari location, claims that Antle denies. On June 3, 2022, Antle was arrested by the FBI for charges related to money laundering.

Early life and education 
Doc Antle was born Kevin Antle in Salinas, California in 1960. Antle grew up on an industrial farm in Salinas, part of a wealthy family connected to Tanimura & Antle, an agricultural company. His father was a boxer. Antle dropped out of school before the ninth grade. As teenagers, Antle and his girlfriend traveled to Virginia to attend a one month yoga retreat at Yogaville, a community founded by Swami Satchidananda Saraswati, an Indian spiritualist. The pair got married after the retreat and changed their names. Antle performed magic shows at the Yogaville ashram and became a close associate of Satchidananda.

Through family business connections, Antle traveled to China where he studied basic medical training to serve rural populations and earned the nickname “doc”. He returned to the U.S. in the 1980s, a time where American interest in health food and mindful living was growing, and began practicing alternative medicine in the Yogaville community in Virginia.

Although Antle has claimed to have a PhD in zoology, two of his former wives and other former staff members stated that he never attained a PhD, they also stated that he never went to a university, nor does he have a college degree of any kind. They claimed he instead paid someone to write that he was a doctor on a certificate while in China during a medical training course.

Career

In the 1980s Antle practiced as a magician and opened a private zoo in Buckingham County, Virginia on a 14-acre property near the Yogaville ashram that held 100 animals including lions, tigers, bears, monkeys, and an elephant. The private zoo was opened in 1983.

Antle is the founder and director of The Institute for Greatly Endangered and Rare Species (T.I.G.E.R.S.) in Myrtle Beach, South Carolina and the Myrtle Beach Safari, a tour that runs through the facility. He is a self-described conservationist and is the executive director of the Rare Species Fund, a nonprofit organization that purports to fund wildlife conservation. Journalists have raised questions about how revenue generated by Antle's cub petting tours is distributed between his business and his nonprofit organization.

Film and television
Writing in Variety, Rebecca Rubin states, "Antle has ties to Hollywood, having worked as an animal expert on films like "Dr. Dolittle" and "Ace Ventura: Pet Detective." He appeared frequently on late night talk shows and also provided creatures for movies including "The War," "The Jungle Book," "Ace Ventura: When Nature Calls," "Mighty Joe Young" and "The Jungle Book 2." Antle was credited as a "principal animal trainer" in the 1994 and 1995 Ace Ventura films, a "trainer" in the 1994 and 1997 Jungle Book films and as an animal trainer in Mighty Joe Young.

In 2001, Antle was on stage with Britney Spears during her performance of "I'm a Slave 4 U" at the 2001 MTV Video Music Awards, which featured a caged tiger and a large albino python draped over Spears' shoulders. In 2008, Suryia and Roscoe, an orangutan and an orphaned blue tick hound which had formed an unusual relationship at Antle's zoo, appeared on the Oprah Winfrey Show in Chicago.

Controversy

Antle was the subject of a three-part true crime documentary spin-off of Tiger King, titled Tiger King: The Doc Antle Story released by Netflix on December 10, 2021.

Accusations of animal abuse
Antle was fined by the USDA for abandoning deer and peacocks at his zoo in Buckingham, Virginia in 1989. In total, Antle has more than 35 USDA violations for mistreating animals. Joe Exotic, who operated the Greater Wynnewood Exotic Animal Park, accused Antle of killing tigers in gas chambers to make space for further breeding. Antle delivered seven tigers to the Samut Prakan zoo in Thailand, which is a zoo that has faced allegations of keeping animals in terrible conditions.

Antle runs a charity called Rare Species Fund, which is dedicated towards protecting animals living in the wild. However, former employees of Antle have claimed that much of the charity's donations are funneled back to Antle.

In late December 2019, South Carolina Law Enforcement Division, South Carolina Department of Natural Resources and Horry County Police Department raided Doc Antle's Myrtle Beach Safari. Antle told media at the time that this was for DNA testing lions for a multi-state investigation.

In 2020, Antle was reported as being investigated by the United States Department of Agriculture and the United States Department of Justice for the illegal sale of big cats including tigers.

Criminal charges
Antle was indicted in October 2020 by a grand jury in Frederick County, Virginia, after a months-long investigation by the Animal Law Unit of the Virginia Attorney General. The charges included felony wildlife trafficking as well as misdemeanor animal cruelty and violations of the Endangered Species Act. Prosecutors contend that Antle carried or caused the lions to be carried in a “cruel, brutal, or inhumane manner, so as to produce torture or unnecessary suffering.” A trial date was set for July 2022.

Antle was arrested on June 3, 2022, by the FBI and booked into jail for charges related to money laundering. He also faces charges relating to illegally trafficking animals, including leopards, cheetahs and a chimpanzee, in violation of the Endangered Species Act.

Antle's trial was delayed until June 12, 2023 due to the father of one of Antle's attorneys suffering a stroke.

Accusations of running a cult
Former employees of Antle's zoo, Myrtle Beach Safari, have accused him of using the zoo to create a cult-like following around him. Antle has expressed expectations that his employees must see the zoo as more than a workplace, as it is an all encompassing lifestyle. Antle has required female employees to be single, childless, to abstain from eating meat, and to wear certain clothing and weigh within 20 pounds of their "perfect athletic weight." Writing for PopMatters, John Glover described Antle's operation as one where "staff is  women who were groomed as teenagers for polygamy", an environment which Antle himself describes as a "complex lifestyle".

Barbara Fisher, a former employee of T.I.G.E.R.S. who worked with Antle from 1999 to 2007, stated that she was pressured to get breast implants while working at the facility and that several employees legally changed their names under the direction of Antle. In the Netflix show, Tiger King: The Doc Antle Story, Antle's former partner, Sumati Steinberg, alleges that when she tried to leave, Antle abused her by choking her until she passed out and breaking two of her ribs. Antle's second wife, Radha Hirsch, claims that she met Antle when she was just 11 years-old much to the chagrin of her mother, who attempted to end their relationship three years later when it became sexual. However, soon after, Antle picked Hirsch up from school and she ran off to live with him.

Antle has criticized the accusations against him and his facility, specifically calling Fisher's claims "ramblings" and saying she has "issues and somehow those have boiled up".

Personal life
Antle is a vegetarian. He married his first wife, Betsy "Brami" Rodgers around the time they both attended a one month yoga retreat at Yogaville while teenagers. Rodgers and Antle have one child, a daughter named Devi. Two of Antle's former partners have stated that he practiced polygamy and had initiated relationships with them while they were 14-year-old members of the Yogaville community. Antle had a long term relationship with Sumati Steinberg, and they have one child, a daughter named Tilakam. Rodgers, Antle's first wife, has claimed that he established the polygamous relationships without her consent. Antle's second marriage was to Radha Hirsch. Antle and his third wife, Dawn Thurston, had two children, Kody and Tawny, prior to Thurston's death in a car accident at age 29.

Several of Antle's children have worked with him at the Myrtle Beach Safari. Antle's daughters Tawny and Tilakam have both been criminally charged for animal cruelty and violations of the Endangered Species Act.

References

External links

 Doc Antle's Myrtle Beach Safari website
 
Rare Species Fund website
Doc Antle's Tiger Tales blog

1960 births
Animal trainers
20th-century American businesspeople
21st-century American businesspeople
American conservationists
People from Myrtle Beach, South Carolina
Living people
Tiger King